General Duval may refer to:

Blaise Duval (1739–1803), French Cavalry general of the Revolutionary Wars
Isaac H. Duval (1824–1902), Union Army brigadier general and brevet
Marcel Duval (fl. 1970s–2010s), Canadian Forces Air Command lieutenant general
Raymond Duval (1894–1955), French Army general during the Second World War
General Duval, Argentina, a municipality in Argentina